The Lowestoft War Memorial Museum is a museum located in Lowestoft in the English county of Suffolk. It is housed in the World War II headquarters of the Royal Naval Patrol Service in Sparrows Nest Gardens in the north of the town. The museum is dedicated to all of the people of Lowestoft who served during World War I and World War II. It was opened in 1995, to coincide with the 50th anniversary of VE day on 8 May that year.

The museum is operated by volunteers and is open on some weekends and school holidays during the summer period. Inside the museum is a small chapel and the roll of honour for civilians killed by enemy action in Lowestoft during both World Wars. There are numerous exhibits and photographs, including many that relate to the wartime defences of the town and the effect on the town and its population of the destruction caused by enemy bombing. Other artifacts and photographs tell the stories of the servicemen and women who either served in, or who came from, Lowestoft.

History 

Sparrows Nest originally formed the grounds and formal gardens to the early 19th century thatched summer residence of Robert Sparrow, a local wealthy landowner. The local council bought the gardens in the 1890s. The gardens became a popular venue for concerts and, in 1913, the Borough of Lowestoft commissioned the 1300-seat Pavilion Theatre in the gardens.

The museum building was built by the Royal Navy as an extension to the house following the commandeering of the site as the headquarters and central depot for the Royal Naval Patrol Service in September 1939. The base was originally named Pembroke X before being renamed HMS Europa until its decommissioning in 1946. The thatched two storey residence was demolished by the local authority in the 1960s, leaving the brick and concrete extensions which now form the Lowestoft War Memorial Museum, the Royal Naval Patrol Service Museum and a café.

Prior to its restoration in the 1990s, the building had become dilapidated, with a downstairs room, previously used by the Suffolk Wildlife Trust, in a reasonable condition, but the upstairs room needing a lot of work. Funds for the refurbishment of the building, which cost £23,000, were largely raised by Jack Rose, through the sales of his local history books and by slide shows.

Exhibits

References

External links
 Museum Website

Military and war museums in England
World War I museums in the United Kingdom
World War II museums in the United Kingdom
World War I memorials in England
World War II memorials in England
Local museums in Suffolk
Lowestoft